The Radio Academy Awards, started in 1983, were the most prestigious awards in the British radio industry. For most of their existence, they were run by ZAFER Associates, but in latter years were brought under the control of The Radio Academy.

The awards were generally referred to by the name of their first sponsor, Sony, as The Sony Awards, The Sony Radio Awards or variations. In August 2013, Sony announced the end of its sponsorship agreement with The Radio Academy after 32 years. Consequently, the awards were named simply The Radio Academy Awards. In November 2014, it was announced that The Radio Academy would not be holding the awards in 2015, and would be looking for other ways to recognise achievement in the future.

The awards were relaunched in 2016 as the Audio & Radio Industry Awards (ARIAS).

Awards format 
The awards were organised into various categories, with nominees being announced a few weeks before the main awards ceremony.  The categories varied slightly each year, and were decided by an annual committee, with the aim to include all the main areas from music, news and speech through to radio drama, comedy and sport, and not discriminating against station size, or niche categories.

In most categories, five entries were shortlisted with the top three awarded Bronze, Silver and Gold.  Some categories (such as the Station of the Year categories) only three entries were shortlisted, with only a Gold winner awarded.  In a number of special categories (such as The Gold Award or Special Award) there was no shortlist, merely a winner.

1983 Gold Award winners

1984 Gold Award winners

1985 Gold Award winners

1986 Gold Award winners

1987 Gold Award winners

1988 Gold Award winners

1989 Gold Award winners

1990 Gold Award winners

1991 Gold Award winners

1992 Gold Award winners

1993 Gold Award winners

1994 Gold Award winners

1995 Gold Award winners

1996 Gold Award winners

1997 Gold Award winners

2000 Gold Award winners 
The 18th Sony Radio Academy Awards ceremony was held at the Grosvenor House Hotel in London on 2 May 2000. BBC Radio 4 was the most nominated station, with 24 entries, and received four awards. Guests included the actors Jenny Agutter and Christopher Lee, Chris Smith (Secretary of State for Culture), and Dale Winton, who all presented awards.

2001 Gold Award winners 
The 19th Sony Radio Academy Awards ceremony, hosted by Paul Gambaccini, was held at the Grosvenor House Hotel in London on 30 April 2001. The BBC won gold awards in 23 out of 30 categories. A new category, Digital Terrestrial Station, (won by OneWord Radio) was introduced. The winner of the lifetime achievement award, Chris Tarrant, criticised the commercial sector for suppressing spontaneity in radio.

2002 Gold Award winners 
The 20th Sony Radio Academy Awards ceremony, hosted by Paul Gambaccini, was held at the Grosvenor House Hotel in London on 2 May 2002. BBC Radio 4 won the most awards (six). Guests included the singers Jarvis Cocker and Feargal Sharkey, actress Janet Suzman, and the girl group Sugababes who all presented awards.

2003 Gold Award winners 
The 21st Sony Radio Academy Awards ceremony, hosted by Paul Gambaccini, was held at the Grosvenor House Hotel in London on 8 May 2003. BBC Radio 4 won six awards including UK Station of the Year. Guests included Grace Jones, Sam Fox, Tony Blackburn, and Meatloaf who all presented awards.

2004 Gold Award winners 
The 22nd Sony Radio Academy Awards ceremony, hosted by Paul Gambaccini, was held at the Grosvenor House Hotel in London on 12 May 2004. Commercial radio won a number of the top awards but BBC Radio 4 retained the UK Station of the Year award. Guests included Sir Elton John, Penny Lancaster, and Amy Winehouse who all presented awards.

2005 Gold Award winners 
The 23rd Sony Radio Academy Awards ceremony, hosted by Paul Gambaccini, was held at the Grosvenor House Hotel in London on 9 May 2005. The BBC won 22 awards including 5 awards for BBC Radio 1. Guests included Alice Cooper, the tennis player Annabel Croft, TV presenter Kirsty Gallacher, BBC Radio 4's Sue MacGregor, Ulrika Jonsson, Heather McCartney and Shakin Stevens who all presented awards.

2006 Gold Award winners 

The 24th Sony Radio Academy Awards ceremony, hosted by Paul Gambaccini, was held at the Grosvenor House Hotel in London on 8 May 2006. Stephen Nolan became the first person to win seven gold Sony awards. Guests included Andrea Corr, Dame Edna Everage, Lenny Henry and Jeff Wayne who all presented awards.

2007 Gold award winners 

The 25th Sony Radio Academy Awards ceremony, hosted by Paul Gambaccini and Terry Wogan, was held at the Grosvenor House Hotel in London on 30 April 2007. The Sony Broadcasters' Broadcaster Award, a special prize to mark the 25th year of the awards, was given to John Peel, who died in 2004. The award was received by Sheila Ravenscroft, Peel's widow. Guests included a selection of actors, singers and broadcasters (Natasha Bedingfield, Katie Derham, Fred and Richard Fairbrass (Right Said Fred), Sir David Frost,
Amanda Holden, Jamelia, Carol Vorderman, Konnie Huq (Blue Peter), Melinda Messenger, Dolores O'Riordan, and Richard Park) who all presented awards.

2008 Gold Award winners 
The 26th Sony Radio Academy Awards ceremony, hosted by Paul Gambaccini, was held at the Grosvenor House Hotel in London on 12 May 2008. The BBC World Service won four awards, including Journalist of the Year for Owen Bennett-Jones. Guests included Edwyn Collins, Joan Collins, Boris Johnson, Al Murray, and Will Young who all presented awards.

2009 Gold Award winners

2010 Gold Award winners

2011 Gold Award winners

2012 Gold Award winners

2013 Gold Award winners

2014 Gold Award winners

Notes

References

External links
Official site

 
British radio awards
1983 establishments in the United Kingdom
Awards established in 1983
2014 disestablishments in the United Kingdom
Awards disestablished in 2014